This is a list of the 1973 PGA Tour Qualifying School graduates.

The tournament returned to a 144-hole final. After three 72-hole regional qualifiers, there were 78 players in the final field. The first four rounds were played at Perdido Bay Country Club in Pensacola, Florida in mid-October and the final four at Dunes Golf Club in Myrtle Beach, South Carolina the following week. They changed courses because the tour was attempting to prepare participants what week-to-week life would be like if they graduated onto the PGA Tour.

Ben Crenshaw won the event by 12 strokes. Recently one of the leading amateurs in the country, Crenshaw "gave more credence to projections that he would become golf's next dominating player." Joe Inman, in his second attempt at Q-school, successfully moved on to the PGA Tour. He finished in a tie for sixth place. A total of 23 players earned their tour cards.

Source:

References

PGA Tour Qualifying School
Golf in Florida
Golf in South Carolina
PGA Tour Qualifying School Graduates
PGA Tour Qualifying School Graduates